Nicklas Danielsson (born 7 December 1984) is a Swedish professional ice hockey player. He is currently playing with Djurgårdens IF in the HockeyAllsvenskan (Allsv). He previously played with Brynäs IF in the Swedish Hockey League (SHL) and was drafted by the Vancouver Canucks in the fifth round of the 2003 NHL Entry Draft, 160th overall.

After scoring 47 points in 46 games in his first full season in the NLA with the Rapperswil-Jona Lakers in 2014–15, Danielsson signed an optional two-year contract with fellow Swiss club, Lausanne HC on 23 April 2015.

Career statistics

Regular season and playoffs

International

References

External links

1984 births
Living people
SC Bern players
Brynäs IF players
Djurgårdens IF Hockey players
Lausanne HC players
HC Lev Praha players
Modo Hockey players
SC Rapperswil-Jona Lakers players
Swedish ice hockey right wingers
Vancouver Canucks draft picks
Sportspeople from Uppsala
Swedish expatriate ice hockey people
Swedish expatriate sportspeople in the Czech Republic
Swedish expatriate sportspeople in Switzerland
Expatriate ice hockey players in the Czech Republic
Expatriate ice hockey players in Switzerland